Wolfiporia castanopsis is a species of wood-decay fungus in the order Polyporales. It is found in Yunnan, China, where it grows on the rotten wood of Castanopsis orthacantha. The type locality was the Zixishan Nature Reserve in Chuxiong. The fungus, described as new to science in 2011 by mycologist Yu-Cheng Dai, is named for the tree with which it associates.

References

Polyporaceae
Fungi described in 2011
Fungi of China
Taxa named by Yu-Cheng Dai